Lotfabad-e Shur (also Romanized as Loţfābād-e Shūr; also known as Loţfābād and Lotf Abad Hoomeh) is a village in Azadegan Rural District, in the Central District of Rafsanjan County, Kerman Province, Iran. At the 2006 census, its population was 700, in 162 families.

References 

Populated places in Rafsanjan County